John Francis Junkin (29 January 1930 – 7 March 2006) was an English actor and scriptwriter who had a long career in radio, television and film, specialising in comedy.

Early life

Born in Ealing, Middlesex, the son of a policeman, he and his parents subsequently moved to Forest Gate so that he could attend St Bonaventure's Catholic School there, before qualifying as a teacher at St Mary's College, Strawberry Hill. He worked as a primary school teacher in the East End for three years before becoming a professional actor and scriptwriter.

Career
In 1960, Junkin joined Joan Littlewood's Stratford East Theatre Workshop and played the lead in the original production of Sparrers Can't Sing. A few years later, he joined the Royal Court Theatre company, and was the foil to Tony Hancock in some of Hancock's last work for British television. Junkin played a diverse range of roles on the small screen; however, he is best remembered for his comedy roles and his appearances as a television quiz master. To international audiences, he may be best remembered for playing Shake, the assistant to Norman Rossington, in the Beatles film A Hard Day's Night. In comedy roles, Junkin was rarely short of work, on account of his ability to play the stony-faced symbol of low level, petty-minded and unquestioning authority, whether the army sergeant, police constable or site foreman.

One of his rare leading roles was in the BBC series The Rough with the Smooth, in which he and Tim Brooke-Taylor played comedy writers (with both actors contributing scripts to the series as well). He also hosted his own afternoon television series in the mid-1970s. Titled simply Junkin, it was produced by Southern Television for the ITV network.

Junkin has an entry in the Guinness Book of Records as the voice of Mr Shifter, one of the chimps in the PG Tips tea advertisement, the longest-running series of commercials on television.

With Barry Cryer, Junkin wrote for Morecambe and Wise from 1978 to 1983, in addition to two Christmas specials in 1972 and 1976.

Personal life and death
Junkin lived in Wendover, Buckinghamshire. He married public relations executive Jenny Claybourn in 1977 and had a daughter, Annabel. Junkin and his wife separated in 1992. He died from lung cancer on 7 March 2006 in the Florence Nightingale House, Aylesbury, several miles from his home. A heavy smoker, he had also been suffering from emphysema and asthma. His life and work were honoured at the British Academy Television Awards in 2006.

Acting credits

Film

Doctor in Love (1960) – Policeman (uncredited)
The Dock Brief (1962) – Dock brief barrister (uncredited)
The Primitives (1962) – Arthur
The Brain (1962) – Frederick (uncredited)
The Wrong Arm of the Law (1963) – Maurice (uncredited)
Sparrows Can't Sing (1963) – Bridge Operator (uncredited)
Heavens Above! (1963) – Reporter at Space Launch Site (uncredited)
The Break (1963) – Harry
Hot Enough for June (1964) – Clerk in Opening Scene
The Pumpkin Eater (1964) – Undertaker
A Hard Day's Night (1964) – Shake
Doctor in Clover (1966) – Prison Warder (uncredited)
The Wrong Box (1966) – First Engine Driver
Kaleidoscope (1966) – Dominion Porter
The Sandwich Man (1966) – Chauffeur
How I Won the War (1967) – Large Child
The Plank (1967) – One Eyed Truck Driver
Simon, Simon (1970) – 2nd Workman – Driver
Confessions of a Driving Instructor (1976) – Luigi
Confessions from a Holiday Camp (1977) – Whitemonk
Rosie Dixon – Night Nurse (1978) –  Mr. Dixon
Wombling Free (1978) – County Surveyor
Brass Target (1978) – Carberry
That Summer! (1979) – Mr. Swales
Licensed to Love and Kill (1979) – Helicopter Mechanic
A Handful of Dust (1988) – Blenkinsop
Chicago Joe and the Showgirl (1990) – George Heath
Girl from Rio (2001) – Mr. Bigelow
The Football Factory (2004) – Albert Moss (final film role)

Radio
 Floggit's
Radio Caroline (first voice of the test transmissions in March 1964)
Hello, Cheeky! with Tim Brooke-Taylor and Barry Cryer
Just a Minute as an occasional guest
I'm Sorry I Haven't A Clue
Junkin's Jokers

Television
Winning Widows (1962, 1 episode) 
Dr. Finlay's Casebook Series 1 episode 6: "Cough Mixture", 1962 – Dougal Todd
Hancock (1963, 1 episode) – Jerry Spring
The Plane Makers, (1963) – Dusty Miller
The Avengers (1963–1967) – Sergeant / Sheriff
The Blackpool Show (1966 series with Tony Hancock) – Himself
Further Adventures of Lucky Jim (1967) – 
Sam and Janet (1967) ITV, Two series of sitcom with Joan Sims (1) and Vivienne Martin (2)   
Marty, comedy television series with Marty Feldman, Tim Brooke-Taylor and Roland MacLeod (1968–69) – various characters
Catweazle: "The Flying Broom-sticks" (1969) - Police Sergeant
The Goodies (1972) – Police Sergeant
The Shadow of the Tower (1972) – Master John
Looking For Clancy (1975) – Jim Clancy
Lord Peter Wimsey: "Five Red Herrings" (1975) – Mr. Alcock
Out (1978) – Ralph Veneker
The Sweeney (1978) – Taxi Yard Proprietor
Only When I Laugh (1979) – Landlord
Odd One Out (1982) – Himself – Voiceover (voice)
The Professionals (1983) – Hollis
Blott on the Landscape (1985) - Waiter
Crosswits (1985, quiz panelist)
Ask No Questions (1986)
Picking Up The Pieces (1988) – Vinny
Mr. Bean (1990) – The Maitre D'
Inspector Morse (1992) – Chief Inspector Holroyd
The Thing About Vince (2000) – Frankie
The Sins (2000) – Archie Rogers
McCready and Daughter (2001)
Coronation Street (1981) – Bill Fielding (a short-lived boyfriend of Elsie Tanner)
EastEnders (2001–2002) – Ernie Johnson

References

External links 
 
 John Junkin: reminiscences of making A Hard Days' Night

1930 births
2006 deaths
Alumni of St Mary's University, Twickenham
British radio people
Deaths from lung cancer in England
English male comedians
English male film actors
English male radio actors
English male television actors
English television writers
Male actors from London
Morecambe and Wise
Offshore radio broadcasters
People educated at St Bonaventure's Catholic School
People from Ealing
20th-century English comedians
British male television writers
20th-century English screenwriters